DS-1 is a drug from the imidazopyridine family, which is the first drug developed that acts as a GABAA receptor positive allosteric modulator (PAM) selective for the α4β3δ subtype, which is not targeted by other GABAA receptor PAMs such as the benzodiazepines or other nonbenzodiazepine drugs. Novel selective drugs such as DS-1 should prove useful in the study of this receptor subtype.

See also 
 Alpidem
 Saripidem
 Zolpidem

References 

Benzamides
Chloroarenes
GABAA receptor positive allosteric modulators
Imidazopyridines
Bromoarenes
Thiophenes